Taddeo Lwanga (born 21 May 1994) is a Ugandan professional footballer who plays for Arta/Solar7 in the Djibouti Premier League and the Uganda national team as a midfielder.

Early  life
At a young age, he was a member of Ndejje United F.C in the second division before engaged in the Buganda Masaza cup for Kyadondo.

Club career

Express FC
In January 2014, Lwanga joined Express FC. He debuted for Express FC against Police FC on 11 February 2014. He scored his first goal for Express FC against Lweza Football Club on 21 November 2014.

SC Villa
In 2015, he joined SC Villa making his debut on against Bright Stars in Mwererwe on 25 August 2015. He marked a memorable time at Sports Club Villa with the winning goal against Sudan's Al Khartoum SC in the CAF Confederations Cup in February 2016. Taddeo had an impressive season helping the SC Villa finish second in Uganda Premier League.

Vipers SC
In 2017, Lwanga joined Vipers SC and sealed a two-year deal with them. He made his debut on against Bright Stars FC on 12 September 2017. He scored his first goal for Vipers SC against Proline FC on 24 December 2017 at St. Mary's Stadium.

Lwanga played his first game of the 2018–19 season on 28 September 2018 against Ndejje University at St. Mary's Stadium, Vipers won 1–0. He scored his first goal in the season against Proline in the Uganda Cup at StarTimes Stadium Lugoggo on 12 March 2019. He played his last game in the season against Bul FC on 4 May 2019 at St. Mary's Stadium. He played a total of 23 matches in the season. Vipers finished second in the league.

Tanta
In August 2019, Lwanga joined Egyptian Premier League side Tanta SC.

Simba SC
On 2 December 2020, Lwanga joined Simba SC on a two-year contract deal.

Arta/Solar7
On 19 August 2022, Lwanga joined Arta/Solar7 as a free agent on a two-year contract deal.

International career
Taddeo made his debut for Uganda national team against Malawi national team in a friendly  match at Kamuzu stadium.

Career statistics

International

Honours

Club
SC Villa
 FUFA Super Cup runners-up: 2015

Vipers SC
 Ugandan Cup runners-up: 2017–18
 Ugandan Premier League: 2017–18

Individual
 Team of the Year Uganda Azam Premier League (1): 2016–17
 Airtel FUFA Player of the Year Awards  Nominee (1): 2016–17

References

External links
 
 

1994 births
Living people
Association football midfielders
Ugandan footballers
Uganda international footballers
SC Villa players
Express FC players
Vipers SC players
Tanta SC players
2019 Africa Cup of Nations players
Sportspeople from Kampala
Uganda A' international footballers
2018 African Nations Championship players
Ugandan expatriate footballers
Ugandan expatriate sportspeople in Tanzania
Expatriate footballers in Tanzania
Ugandan expatriate sportspeople in Egypt
Expatriate footballers in Egypt
Simba S.C. players
AS Arta/Solar7 players
Djibouti Premier League players
Expatriate footballers in Djibouti
Ugandan expatriate sportspeople in Djibouti